Quasimitra bovei is a species of sea snail, a marine gastropod mollusk in the family Mitridae, the miters or miter snails.

Description
The length of the shell attains 50.6 mm.

Distribution
This species occurs in the Red Sea.

References

 Cernohorsky, W.O., 1976 The Mitridae of the World. Part I. The subfamily Mitrinae. Indo Pacific Mollusca, vol. 3(17)

External links
 Kiener L.C. (1834-1841). Spécies général et iconographie des coquilles. Vol. 3. Famille des Columellaires. Genres Mitre (Mitra), Lamarck, pp. 1-120, pl. 1-34
 Fedosov A., Puillandre N., Herrmann M., Kantor Yu., Oliverio M., Dgebuadze P., Modica M.V. & Bouchet P. (2018). The collapse of Mitra: molecular systematics and morphology of the Mitridae (Gastropoda: Neogastropoda). Zoological Journal of the Linnean Society. 183(2): 253-337

bovei
Gastropods described in 1838